Alchemy CMS, or just Alchemy, is a free and open-source content management system written on top of the Ruby on Rails web application framework. It is released under the BSD license and the code is available on GitHub. It comes as a mountable engine and is packaged as a Ruby gem.

History 

In 2007 the project started closed source and had a different name. In June 2010 the software was open sourced under the name Alchemy CMS by Thomas von Deyen. Since Alchemy CMS is a ruby gem it gets released on the rubygems.org platform.

Features 

 Templating system
 Multilingual websites
 Multisite management
 User access control
 Fulltext search engine
 Contact forms
 Downloadable attachments
 Image processing
 Extendable Through Rails engines
 Template caching
 Admin interface for resource controllers

References

External links 

 Official website

Content management systems
Software using the BSD license